John Clarke  (–1653) was an English physician.

Life 
John Clarke was born in 1582 at Brooke Hall, near Wethersfield in Essex, where his family had long been seated. He was educated at Christ's College, Cambridge, and took his first degree in 1603, proceeding MA 1608, and MD 1615.

He was elected a fellow of the College of Physicians in 1622, was treasurer 1643–4, and president from 1645 to 1649, both years included, and while in office carried out a revision of the Pharmacopœia. His name is spelt Clerk(e) in the first edition of Glisson's De Rachitide, 1650, a work which received his official sanction.

He died 30 April 1653, and his body was escorted by the president and fellows from his house to his tomb, in the Church of St. Martin-without-Ludgate. He left a son, and a daughter who married Sir John Micklethwaite, the physician, and whose daughter Ann gave to the College of Physicians the portrait of Clarke which hangs in the reading-room.

Notes

References 

 Birken, William (2008). "Clarke, John (1582?–1653), physician". In Oxford Dictionary of National Biography. Oxford University Press.
  
 "John Clarke (b.? d.30 April 1653)". Royal College of Physicians. 2019. Retrieved 1 May 2022.

1580s births
1653 deaths
Presidents of the Royal College of Physicians
Fellows of the Royal College of Physicians
17th-century English medical doctors
People from Essex (before 1965)